Heaven in the Dark is a 2016 Hong Kong drama film directed by Steve Yuen and starring Jacky Cheung and Karena Lam. The film is adapted from the play, French Kiss by Candace Chong.

Plot
After a drunken night out, well respected pastor Marco (Jacky Cheung) shares a kiss with Michelle (Karena Lam), a parishioner at his church who he had been growing close to. A seemly consensual kiss turns scandalise after Marco is accused of sexual harassment and a court case ensues.

Cast
Jacky Cheung as Reverend Marco To 
Karena Lam as Michelle
Lan Law as Prosecution Lawyer
Anthony Wong as Barrister Francis Lee
Wong He as Reverend Cheung 
Edmond So as Mr. Lam  
Michelle Wai as Yee  
Tyson Chak as Praetor
Catherine Chau as Wong Yuen-yuen
Cheuk Wan-chi as Cheung Oi-wah
Rosa Maria Velasco as Susanna
Chu Pak-him as Paul
Dayo Wong as Court audit
James Li as court audit

Soundtrack

Featured song

Reception
At the Hong Kong box office, the film took US$410,040 with less than favourable reviews from both the South China Morning Post and the Straits Times. Despite negative reviews, Jacky Cheung and Karena Lam were nominated for Best Actor and Best Actress respectively at the 36th Hong Kong Film Awards. At the 53rd Golden Horse Film Festival and Awards Cheung again was nominated for Best Actor.

References

External links
 
 

2016 films
2016 drama films
Hong Kong drama films
Courtroom films
2010s Cantonese-language films
Hong Kong films based on plays
Films about sexual abuse
Films set in Hong Kong
Films shot in Hong Kong
2016 directorial debut films
2010s Hong Kong films